Bhagwati Prasad (judge) (13 May 1949 – 19 November 2017) was an Indian Judge and former Chief Justice of Jharkhand High Court.

Early life
Prasad was born in 1949 at Bahadra, Hanumangarh district of Rajasthan. He passed B.Sc. in 1969 from Govt. Post Graduate College, Hisar and completed LL.B. in 1972 from Dungar College of Bikaner. In 1986, Prasad also passed LL.M. from University of Jodhpur. He was the member of Rotary International and visited USA in 1975.

Career
Prasad was enrolled as an advocate on 2 September 1972 in Rajasthan Bar Council and became the secretary, Rajasthan High Court Advocates Association in 1976. He practiced for 24 years in the Rajasthan High Court. In 1996 he was appointed a judge of the Rajasthan High Court and on 7 February 2008 he was transferred to the Gujarat High Court. Justice Prasad was elevated as the Chief Justice of Jharkhand High Court on 22 August 2010 and retired on 12 May 2011. After that he was the chairperson of the Gujarat State Human Rights Commission on 4 August 2017. Justice Prasad died on 19 November 2017 at the age of 68.

References

1949 births
2017 deaths
Indian judges
Judges of the Rajasthan High Court
Judges of the Gujarat High Court
Chief Justices of the Jharkhand High Court
People from Hanumangarh district
20th-century Indian judges
20th-century Indian lawyers
21st-century Indian lawyers
21st-century Indian judges